Brian Plummer was a Canadian rock musician born in Tisdale, Saskatchewan. He attended high school in North Battleford.

Plummer started his musical career with Ottawa band Trina.
After the band split, Plummer teamed up with lyricist Al Higbee.  This collaboration proved successful in securing a recording contract. Plummer's first album, No Questions, was released in 1980 resulting in two hits: "Money Talks" and "Jacky Boy".  Plummer spent the following years touring, writing and recording six more albums. I'm As Guilty as You (1982), No Questions (1983 re-release).
In 1984 Plummer recorded as “Brian Plummer & Suspects” two albums “ without a mark”  Produced by Gene Martynec, with Jack Hazebroek on drums, Phil Rohr on bass and Bruce Fowler on keyboards and in 1986, Brian Plummer & The Suspects. He again toured extensively across Canada with this band. After touring for many years Plummer concentrated on writing radio and TV jingles.
Plummer released his fifth album Plums (1999): a compilation CD which also includes 8 brand new songs. His final album was Perfect World (2007)

Brian died of cancer April 30, 2008.

Discography

Singles
as Brian Plummer
1980 Money Talks (Change/MCA) CH-45028
1980 Jacky Boy (Change/MCA)
1980 Wizards Have Come/ (Change/MCA)
1981 Lisa/The King of The Jungle (Sefel/Almada) 45-006

as Brian Plummer and the Suspects
1984 Dull Razor/Looking Glass Street (Duke Street) DSR-71003
1984 Dream Research/A Good Lie (Always Works) (Duke Street) DSR-81002
1985 Stop Running/Might Makes Right (Duke Street) DSR-71012
1985 All Day, All Night/Anxiety (Duke Street) DSR-81012

Albums
as Brian Plummer
1980 No Questions (Change/MCA) CLP-8010
1981 I'm As Guilty As You (Sefel/Almada) SEF-1002
1981 No Questions [remixed] (Sefel/Almada) SEF-1005
1999 Plums (ABCD Company) ABCD 32848-1
2007 Perfect World

as Brian Plummer and the Suspects
1984 Without A Mark (Duke Street) DSR-31002
1985 Brian Plummer And The Suspects (Duke Street) DSR-31012

References
BrianPlummer.com
alexgitlin.com
cvnet.net
cdbaby.com
jamcanoe.ca
v3.ca
newworldcds.com
home.interlog.com
aor-melodicrock.com
Imusic.com

Canadian rock singers
2008 deaths
Year of birth missing
Musicians from Saskatchewan